The 1943–44 Svenska Serien season was the ninth and final season of the Svenska Serien, the top level ice hockey league in Sweden. It was replaced by the Swedish Division I for 1944–45. Hammarby IF won the Svenska Serien for the sixth straight year.

Final standings

External links
1943-44 season

Svenska Serien (ice hockey) seasons
1943–44 in Swedish ice hockey leagues